Erechthias exospila is a species of moth in the family Tineidae. It was described by Edward Meyrick in 1901 using a specimen he collected in Whangarei in December. This species is endemic to New Zealand.

References

External links
Image of type specimen of Erechthias exospila

Moths described in 1901
Erechthiinae
Moths of New Zealand
Endemic fauna of New Zealand
Taxa named by Edward Meyrick
Endemic moths of New Zealand